Dale Roland Carl Rolfe (born April 30, 1940) is a Canadian former ice hockey defenseman. He played for four teams in the National Hockey League between 1960 and 1975. He spent his junior career with the Barrie Flyers through the 1956–57 and 1959–60 seasons. During the 1959–60 NHL season, Rolfe played three games with the Boston Bruins as well as two games with the Kingston Frontenacs of the EPHL.

Professional career
Rolfe then spent the 1960–61 and 1961–62 season with the Portland Buckaroos of the Western Hockey League. Rolfe then moved to the American Hockey League where he spent the next season with the Hershey Bears and the following four seasons with the Springfield Indians. In the 1967–68 season, he returned to the National Hockey League, playing for the Los Angeles Kings. He played for the Kings until he was traded to the Detroit Red Wings on February 20, 1970. Rolfe stayed with Detroit for the remainder of the 1969–70 season and the majority of the 1970–71 season before being traded to the New York Rangers for Jim Krulicki where he would spend the rest of his professional career, retiring after the 1974–75 NHL season. 
 
Rolfe played a total of 509 NHL regular season games with 25 goals, 125 assists and 556 penalty minutes.

He was recognized by opponents to be a smart defender who used tremendous reach and strength to play the puck or take a man out of the play.

Career statistics

Regular season and playoffs

External links
 

1940 births
Living people
Boston Bruins players
Canadian ice hockey right wingers
Detroit Red Wings players
Hershey Bears players
Ice hockey people from Ontario
Kingston Frontenacs (EPHL) players
Los Angeles Kings players
New York Rangers players
Portland Buckaroos players
Sportspeople from Timmins
Springfield Indians players